The BBC Bridge Companion is an 8-bit video game console designed for teaching bridge, produced by BBC Enterprises Ltd. It was released in 1985 in the United Kingdom, retailing for £199.99.

History 

Maths teacher Andrew Kambites wanted to generate income from bridge due to his love for the game. He would combine this with his programming background to develop the BBC Bridge Companion.

List of cartridges 

The software library consists entirely of interactive tutorials on different aspects of bridge.
 Advanced Bidding
 Advanced Defence
 Bridge Builder
 Club Play 1
 Club Play 2
 Club Play 3
 Conventions 1
 Duplicate 1
 Master Play 1

References

External links 
 Profile of Andrew Kambites, BBC Bridge Companion programmer.

Products introduced in 1985
Third-generation video game consoles
BBC
Contract bridge in the United Kingdom
Z80-based video game consoles